The Amanda Show is an American live action sketch comedy and variety show television series created by Dan Schneider that aired on Nickelodeon from October 16, 1999 to September 21, 2002. It starred Amanda Bynes, Drake Bell, and Nancy Sullivan, and featured John Kassir, Raquel Lee, and Josh Peck. The show was a spin-off from All That, in which Bynes had co-starred for several years. The show ended on September 21, 2002. Writers for the show included Schneider, John Hoberg, Steven Molaro, and Andrew Hill Newman.

In 2002, after the end of The Amanda Show, Dan Schneider created a new series, called Drake & Josh, featuring Drake Bell, Josh Peck, and Nancy Sullivan.

Format

The Amanda Show is a sketch comedy television program set in a universe in which it is broadcast as a popular television comedy (a show-within-a-show). Recurring sketches include "Judge Trudy", a spoof of the courtroom reality Judge Judy; "So You Want to Win Five Dollars?", a spoof of the ABC game show Who Wants to Be a Millionaire?; and "Blockblister", a spoof of the now-defunct video rental store Blockbuster.

Episodes

Cast members

 Amanda Bynes – Herself, Penelope Taynt, Judge Trudy, Blini Blokey, Amber, Doreen, Cynthia Worthington, Moody, Crazy Courtney, Candy Tulips, Katie Klutz, Lula Mae, Cindy Extreme, Sharon, Melody, Mother Caboose, Babs Wrestleberg, People Place Owner 
 Nancy Sullivan – Herself, Miss Yumbo, Mrs. Klutz, Marcy Stimple, Mrs. DeBoat, Mrs. Rostensan, Mrs. Extreme, Ms. Berkle, Various
 Drake Bell – Himself, Carter Klutz, Totally Kyle, Biscotti Blokey, Jeremy Pivers, Eenis, Tony Pajamas, Toby, Thad, Jason Fima, Calvin Stubbs, Various
 Raquel Lee (season 1) – Herself, Sheila ("The Girl's Room" segment, season 1), Various
 John Kassir (season 1) – Himself, Carl Klutz, Mr. Rostensan, Gnocchi Blokey, Doreen's Dad, Mr. Gullible, Principal Thorn, Various (season 1)
 Josh Peck (seasons 2–3) – Himself, The Dancing Lobster 2, Paulie, Gerald Phillip, Gordy Moller, Various

Supporting cast members

 Brian Ahearn – Various
 Orlando Ashley - Bailiff ("Judge Trudy" segment, season 2-3)
 E. E. Bell – Barney the Security Guard, Kreblock (episode 25)
 Steffani Brass – Various
 Gregg Berger – Announcer
 Danny Bonaduce – Customer ("Blockblister" segment), Mr. McOliver ("Judge Trudy" segment)
 Matthew Botuchis – Sternum ("Moody's Point" segment)
 Ashley Edner – Rebecca Fyoomay, Various
 Carey Eidel – Moody's Dad ("Moody's Point" segment)
 Taylor Emerson – Preston Taynt
 Shayna Fox - Audience Member, Margie Finkus ("Judge Trudy" segment)
 Taran Killam – Spaulding ("Moody's Point" segment)
 Steven Anthony Lawrence  – Various
 Maureen McCormick – Moody's Mom ("Moody's Point" segment)
 Lara Jill Miller – Kathy
 Jenna Morrison – Debbie ("The Girl's Room" segment, guest spots on "Stranded" and "So You Wanna Win 5 Dollars"), LunchBay.com spokesgirl, Julie ("Sugar Veggies" commercial)
 Andrew Hill Newman – Mr. Gullible (season 2), Various
 Molly Orr – Misty Rains ("Moody's Point" segment), Girl ("Little Crazy Hat Man" commercial), Girl ("Grown Up Remote" commercial)
 Lauren Petty – Brie ("Moody's Point" segment), Babysitter ("Blockblister" segment)
 Reagan Gomez-Preston – Sheila ("The Girl's Room" segment, seasons 2–3)
 Jeremy Rowley - Crazed Customer ("Blockblister" segment)
 Dan Sachoff – Doreen's Dad (seasons 2–3), Mr. Extreme
 Dan Schneider – Mr. Oldman, Announcer, Additional Voices ("Stop Motion Amanda" segments)
 Jamie Snow – Tammy ("The Girl's Room" segment), Customer ("Scooper Dooper" segment), Amy Drummel ("Judge Trudy" segment)
 Radley Watkins – Various
 Gary Anthony Williams – Bailiff ("Judge Trudy" segment)

Broadcast

Streaming
As of March 2021, the show is available to stream on Paramount+, without the four episodes excluded on DVD (1, 5, 8, and 12).

Syndication

Nickelodeon carried reruns of The Amanda Show during its TEENick block until September 5, 2007. On October 13, 2007, reruns started airing as part of the "TEENick on The N" block on The N. Reruns were pulled in March 2008 before airing again from April 4, 2009 to August 3, 2009. The series' original TV rating was TV-Y7, but was changed to TV-G, like all of the other shows that aired on the former TEENick block on Nickelodeon.

On 11 July 2011, the British Nicktoons channel began airing the series; it showed weekdays at 9:00 p.m. Some episodes missing from broadcast included three episodes (episodes 3, 8, 11 and 12) from Season 1, three Season 2 episodes (episodes 3, 7 and 14), and four episodes from Season 3 (episodes 1, 2, 6 and 10). Reasons for these episodes not being shown are unknown.

Nickelodeon Canada began airing the series on September 5, 2011, with the exception of Season 1 episodes 8 and 12 (which featured musical guests), and Season 3 episode 11. The series was removed from the schedule in 2012.

Reruns of The Amanda Show started airing on TeenNick on October 11, 2011. Although it was originally announced as part of TeenNick's 1990s block The '90s Are All That, the series instead aired as a standalone series during the daytime. The show was pulled in April 2012 following Bynes' arrest for a DUI.
The show would later return on September 17, 2012, and aired in two-hour blocks, until being removed again on March 17, 2013. The series later premiered on The Splat (later NickSplat and NickRewind) on June 10, 2016, and on August 27, 2017, as part of a SNICK 25th anniversary marathon, before briefly returning again in 2020.

Home media

References
8. Weingarten, Christopher R., et al. "40 Greatest Sketch-Comedy TV Shows of All Time." Rolling Stone, February 26, 2020, https://www.rollingstone.com/tv/tv-lists/40-greatest-sketch-comedy-tv-shows-of-all-time-142581/the-amanda-show-1999-2002-186898/.

9.  McNally, Victoria. "9 Ways Amanda Bynes Changed Pop Culture For The Better." MTV News, 3 Apr. 2015, https://www.mtv.com/news/2122746/amanda-bynes-birthday-pop-culture-contributions/.

External links

 Official website archived from the original on June 14, 2006
 

1999 American television series debuts
2002 American television series endings
1990s American children's comedy television series
1990s American satirical television series
1990s American sketch comedy television series
1990s American variety television series
1990s Nickelodeon original programming
2000s American children's comedy television series
2000s American satirical television series
2000s American sketch comedy television series
2000s American variety television series
2000s Nickelodeon original programming
All That
American television series with live action and animation
American television spin-offs
English-language television shows
Television series about television
Television series created by Dan Schneider
Television series by Tollin/Robbins Productions
Children's sketch comedy